Robert Dick was a Scottish geologist and botanist.

Robert Dick may also refer to:
 Robert Dick (salt-grieve), 17th century merchant and inspector of salt works, imprisoned on the Bass Rock
 Robert Dick (flutist) (born 1950), American flutist and composer
 Robert P. Dick (1823–1898), American jurist
 Robert Dick (cricketer) (1889–1983), English cricketer
 Robert Henry Dick (1785–1846), Scottish soldier
 Robert Burns Dick (1868–1954), British architect, city planner and artist

See also
 Robert H. Dicke (1916–1997), American physicist
 Robert Dicks